A mail services center or mail service center (MSC) is a central hub for all mail and package shipping and receiving for a large campus (such as that of a university or government facility). The staff at the MSC will sort and take incoming mail to individual departments and pick up departments' outgoing mail as well.

Example of Address specifying an MSC box number
Typically each user or each department has a numbered MSC box; therefore the format of a mailing address is something like the following example:

Prof Jane Roe
Dept of Anthropology, MSC 11625
University of Anywhere
6500 UNIVERSITY DR
ANYTOWN, STATE 12345-6789
USA

Differences between MSC and local mailrooms
The main advantage that drives investment in an MSC is the idea that it will be cheaper to operate over time than multiple local mailrooms (mostly by employing fewer workers), thus paying for itself and then saving the institution money over time.  Another advantage of an MSC is that it may make terrorist threat mitigation easier by forcing all incoming packages to come through one point of entry, where systems are in place to screen and quarantine any suspicious packages. This is cheaper and more reliable than trying to mitigate at more than one point of entry.  Another advantage of an MSC is that such a system is more intuitive to the many users it serves, most of whom (understandably) would not know how their particular institution's system of many mailrooms worked (where all the different mailrooms were, what their hours of operation were, etc.).

Rooms
Postal infrastructure